Billy Jack is a 1971 American action drama independent film, the second of four films centering on a character of the same name which began with the movie The Born Losers (1967), played by Tom Laughlin, who directed and co-wrote the script. Filming began in Prescott, Arizona, in the fall of 1969, but the movie was not completed until 1971. American International Pictures pulled out, halting filming. 20th Century-Fox came forward and filming eventually resumed but when that studio refused to distribute the film, Warner Bros. stepped forward.

Still, the film lacked distribution, so Laughlin booked it into theaters himself in 1971. The film grossed $10 million in its initial run, but eventually added close to $50 million in its re-release, with distribution supervised by Laughlin.

Plot 
Billy Jack is a "mixed-race" Navajo, a Green Beret Vietnam War veteran, and a hapkido master.

Jack defends the hippie-themed Freedom School (inspired by Prescott College) and students from townspeople who do not understand or like the counterculture students. The school is organized by its director, Jean Roberts (Delores Taylor). One of the troubled youths is a girl named Barbara, who became pregnant and was abused by her father.

A group of children of various races from the school go to town for ice cream and are refused service and then abused and humiliated by Bernard Posner (David Roya), the son of the county's corrupt political boss Stuart Posner (Bert Freed), and his gang. This prompts a violent outburst by Billy. Billy goes through a Navajo initiation where he is bitten purposely by a large rattlesnake, so that he would become the blood brother to the snake, and survives the ordeal. Meanwhile, Barbara loses her unborn child, when the horse she was riding stumbles on a rock, causing her to fall off the horse. Following an incident involving Jean, Billy gives Bernard a choice of either receiving a dislocated elbow, or driving his Corvette into the lake; Bernard does the latter. Later, Jean is kidnapped and raped by Bernard, who also murders a Native American student. Billy confronts Bernard, whom he catches in bed with a 13-year-old girl, and sustains a gunshot wound before killing him with a hand strike to the throat. After barricading himself following a climactic shootout with the police and pleading from Jean, Billy Jack surrenders to the authorities in exchange for a decade-long guarantee that the school will be allowed to continue to run with Jean as its head. As Billy is driven away in handcuffs, a large crowd of supporters raise their fists as a show of defiance and support.

Cast 

 Tom Laughlin as Billy Jack
 Delores Taylor as Jean Roberts
 David Roya as Bernard Posner
 Clark Howat as Sheriff Cole
 Victor Izay as Doctor
 Julie Webb as Barbara
 Debbie Schock as Kit
 Teresa Kelly as Carol
 Lynn Baker as Sarah
 Stan Rice as Martin
 John McClure as Dinosaur
 Susan Foster as Cindy
 Susan Sosa as Sunshine
 Bert Freed as Mr. Stuart Posner
 Kenneth Tobey as Deputy Mike
 Howard Hesseman as Howard (credited as Don Sturdy)
 Cisse Cameron as Miss False Eyelashes (credited as Cissie Colpitts)
 Han Bong-soo Fight double for Tom Laughlin

Box-office and critical reception 
Billy Jack holds a 'Fresh' rating of 63% at Rotten Tomatoes based on 16 reviews, with an average grade of 5.37/10.

In his Movie and Video Guide, film critic Leonard Maltin gave Billy Jack 1.5 stars out of 4, writing: 'Seen today, its politics are highly questionable, and its 'message' of peace looks ridiculous, considering the amount of violence in the film.' Roger Ebert gave the film 2.5 stars out of 4 and also saw the message of the film as self-contradictory, writing: 'I'm also somewhat disturbed by the central theme of the movie. Billy Jack seems to be saying the same thing as Born Losers; that a gun is better than a constitution in the enforcement of justice.' Howard Thompson, writing for The New York Times agreed, calling the film 'well-aimed but misguided' as he wrote: 'For a picture that preaches pacifism, Billy Jack seems fascinated by its violence, of which it is full.' He added that 'some of the non-professional delivery of lines in the script by Mr. Frank and Teresa Christina is incredibly awful." Variety magazine opined that 'the action frequently drags' and at nearly two hours' running length, 'The message is rammed down the spectators' throats and is sorely in need of considerable editing to tell a straightforward story.' Gene Siskel gave Billy Jack 3.5 stars out of 4, calling it 'a film that tries to say too many things in too many ways within an adequate story line, but it has such freshness, original humor and compassion that one is frequently moved to genuine emotion'. Kevin Thomas, in the Los Angeles Times, also liked Billy Jack, praising its 'searing tension that sustains it through careening unevenness to a smash finish. Crude and sensational yet urgent and pertinent, this provocative Warners release is in its unique, awkward way one of the year's important pictures.'

Gary Arnold, writing for The Washington Post panned Billy Jack as 'horrendously self-righteous and devious', explaining: 'Every social issue is dramatized in terms of absolute, apolitical good and evil. The good guys...are next to angelic, while the bad guys are, according to the needs of the moment, utter buffoons or utter devils. Anyone with the slightest trace of skepticism or sophistication would tend to reject the movie out of hand and with good reason, since this kind of simplification is dramatically and socially deceitful.' David Wilson, in The Monthly Film Bulletin wrote: 'If in the end Billy Jack is as much a sell-out as any glossier version of commercialised iconoclasm (Billy Jack is persuaded to accept guarantees which a hundred years of Indian history have repudiated), there is enough innocent sincerity in the film to demonstrate that Tom Laughlin at least has the courage of his convictions, even if those convictions are scarcely thought out.'

Delores Taylor received a Golden Globe nomination as Most Promising Newcoming Actress. Tom Laughlin won the grand prize for Billy Jack at the 1971 Taormina International Film Festival in Italy.

Accolades
The film is recognized by American Film Institute in these lists:
 2003: AFI's 100 Years...100 Heroes & Villains:
 Billy Jack – Nominated Hero

Sequels
A direct sequel followed with The Trial of Billy Jack (1974). Billy Jack Goes to Washington (1977) followed three years later, but without a formal release. Plans for The Return of Billy Jack came and went in the mid-1980s.

Soundtrack

The film score was composed, arranged and conducted by Mundell Lowe and the soundtrack album was originally released on the Warner Bros. label.

Reception
The Allmusic review states "a strange and striking combination of styles that somehow is effective... a listenable disc whose flaws only add to the warmth". A cover of Canadian band The Original Caste, the film's theme song, "One Tin Soldier" was recorded by Jinx Dawson, of the band Coven, with session musicians providing the backing and later a re-recording, renamed as "One Tin Soldier (The Legend of Billy Jack)", credited to the band Coven, became a Top 40 hit in 1971 and, again, in 1973.

Track listing
All compositions by Mundell Lowe, except as indicated.
 "One Tin Soldier" (Dennis Lambert, Brian Potter) – 3:18
 "Hello Billy Jack" – 0:45
 "Old and the New" – 1:00
 "Johnnie" (Teresa Kelly) – 2:35
 "Look, Look to the Mountain" (Kelly) – 1:40
 "When Will Billy Love Me" (Lynn Baker) – 3:24
 "Freedom Over Me" (Gwen Smith) – 0:35
 "All Forked Tongue Talk Alike" – 2:54
 "Challenge" – 2:20
 "Rainbow Made of Children" (Baker) – 3:50
 "Most Beautiful Day" – 0:30
 "An Indian Dance" – 1:15
 "Ceremonial Dance" – 1:59
 "Flick of the Wrist" – 2:15
 "It's All She Left Me" – 1:56
 "You Shouldn't Do That" – 3:21
 "Ring Song" (Katy Moffatt) – 4:25
 "Thy Loving Hand" – 1:35
 "Say Goodbye 'Cause You're Leavin'" – 2:36
 "The Theme from Billy Jack" – 2:21
 "One Tin Soldier (End Title)" (Lambert, Potter) – 1:06

Personnel
 Mundell Lowe: arranger, conductor
 Coven featuring Jinx Dawson (tracks 1 & 21), Teresa Kelly (tracks 4 & 5), Lynn Baker (tracks 6 & 10), Gwen Smith (track 7), Katy Moffatt (track 17): vocals
 Other unidentified musicians

Influence 
Marketed as an action film, the story focuses on the plight of Native Americans during the civil rights era. It attained a cult following among younger audiences due to its youth-oriented, anti-authority message and the then-novel martial arts fight scenes which predate the Bruce Lee/kung fu movie trend that followed. The centerpiece of the film features Billy Jack, enraged over the mistreatment of his Native American friends, fighting racist thugs using hapkido techniques.

In 2019, it was revealed that writer-director Quentin Tarantino and actor Brad Pitt used the film and Laughlin's performance as an influence while developing Pitt's character Cliff Booth in Once Upon a Time in Hollywood.

References

External links 
 Laughlin's official Billy Jack web site
 
 Billy Jack at BLACK BELT TV The Martial Arts Network
 The Man Who Made Billy Jack Go Berserk: A Conversation with David Roya—Interview with Billy Jack co-star David "Bernard Posner" Roya
 DVD review of the Billy Jack series and production history
 A vision of American multiplicity, The Village Voice review, August 19, 1971

1971 films
Fictional Navajo people
Films about Native Americans
Films shot in Arizona
Films shot in California
Films shot in New Mexico
Hapkido films
Hippie films
Prescott, Arizona
American vigilante films
Redsploitation
1970s vigilante films
Films directed by Tom Laughlin
1970s English-language films
1970s American films